Mary Edmonia Lewis, also known as "Wildfire" (c. July 4, 1844 – September 17, 1907), was an American sculptor, of mixed African-American and Native American (Mississauga Ojibwe) heritage. Born free in Upstate New York, she worked for most of her career in Rome, Italy. She was the first African-American and Native American sculptor to achieve national and then international prominence. She began to gain prominence in the United States during the Civil War; at the end of the 19th century, she remained the only Black woman artist who had participated in and been recognized to any extent by the American artistic mainstream. In 2002, the scholar Molefi Kete Asante named Edmonia Lewis on his list of 100 Greatest African Americans.

Her work is known for incorporating themes relating to Black people and indigenous peoples of the Americas into Neoclassical-style sculpture.

Life and career

Early life 
 
According to the American National Biography, reliable information about her early life is limited, and Lewis "was often inconsistent in interviews even with basic facts about her origins, preferring to present herself as the exotic product of a childhood spent roaming the forests with her mother’s people." On official documents she variously gave 1842, 1844, and 1854 as her birth year. She was born near Albany, New York. Most of her girlhood was apparently spent in Newark, New Jersey.

Her mother, Catherine Mike Lewis, was African-Native American, of Mississauga Ojibwe and African-American descent. She was an excellent weaver and craftswoman. Two different African-American men are mentioned in different sources as being her father. The first is Samuel Lewis, who was Afro-Haitian and worked as a valet (gentleman's servant). Other sources say her father was the writer on African Americans, Robert Benjamin Lewis. Her half-brother Samuel, who is treated at some length in a history of Montana, said that their father was "a West Indian Frenchman", and his mother "part African and partly a descendant of the educated Narragansett Indians of New York state." (The Narragansett people are originally from Rhode Island.)

By the time Lewis reached the age of nine, both of her parents had died; Samuel Lewis died in 1847 and Robert Benjamin Lewis in 1853. Her two maternal aunts adopted her and her older half-brother Samuel. Samuel was born in 1835 to his father of the same name, and his first wife, in Haiti. The family came to the United States when Samuel was a young child. Samuel became a barber at age 12 after their father died. 

The children lived with their aunts near Niagara Falls, New York, for about four years. Lewis and her aunts sold Ojibwe baskets and other items, such as moccasins and embroidered blouses, to tourists visiting Niagara Falls, Toronto, and Buffalo. During this time, Lewis went by her Native American name, Wildfire, while her brother was called Sunshine. In 1852, Samuel left for San Francisco, California, leaving Lewis in the care of a Captain S. R. Mills. 

By the time she got to college, Lewis was economically privileged, because her older brother Samuel had made a fortune in the California gold rush and "supplied her every want anticipating her wishes after the style and manner of a person of ample income".

In 1856, Lewis enrolled in a pre-college program at New York Central College, a Baptist abolitionist school. At McGrawville, Lewis met many of the leading activists who would become mentors, patrons, and possible subjects for her work as her artistic career developed. In a later interview, Lewis said that she left the school after three years, having been "declared to be wild."

However, her academic record at Central College (1856–fall 1858) has been located, and her grades, "conduct", and attendance were all exemplary. Her classes included Latin, French, "grammar", arithmetic, drawing, composition, and declamation (public speaking).

Education
In 1859, when Edmonia Lewis was about 15 years old, her brother Samuel and abolitionists sent her to Oberlin, Ohio, where she attended the secondary Oberlin Academy Preparatory School for the full, three-year course, before entering Oberlin Collegiate Institute (since 1866, Oberlin College), one of the first U.S. higher-learning institutions to admit women and people of differing ethnicities. The Ladies' Department was designed "to give Young Ladies facilities for the thorough mental discipline, and the special training which will qualify them for teaching and other duties of their sphere." She changed her name to Mary Edmonia Lewis and began to study art. Lewis boarded with Reverend John Keep and his wife from 1859 until she was forced from the college in 1863. At Oberlin, with a student population of one thousand, Lewis was one of only 30 students of color. Reverend Keep was white, a member of the board of trustees, an avid abolitionist, and a spokesperson for coeducation.

Mary said later that she was subject to daily racism and discrimination. She, and other female students, were rarely given the opportunity to participate in the classroom or speak at public meetings.

During the winter of 1862, several months after the start of the US Civil War, an incident occurred between Lewis and two Oberlin classmates, Maria Miles and Christina Ennes. The three women, all boarding in Keep's home, planned to go sleigh riding with some young men later that day. Before the sleighing, Lewis served her friends a drink of spiced wine. Shortly after, Miles and Ennes fell severely ill. Doctors examined them and concluded that the two women had some sort of poison in their system, supposedly cantharides, a reputed aphrodisiac. For a time it was not certain that they would survive. Days later, it became apparent that the two women would recover from the incident. Authorities initially took no action.

News of the controversial incident rapidly spread throughout Ohio. In the town of Oberlin, where the general population was not as progressive as at the college, while Lewis was walking home alone one night she was dragged into an open field by unknown assailants, badly beaten, and left for dead. After the attack, local authorities arrested Lewis, charging her with poisoning her friends. John Mercer Langston, an Oberlin College alumnus and the first African-American lawyer in Ohio, represented Lewis during her trial. Although most witnesses spoke against her and she did not testify, Chapman moved successfully to have the charges dismissed: the contents of the victims' stomachs had not been analyzed and there was, therefore, no evidence of poisoning, no corpus delicti.

The remainder of Lewis' time at Oberlin was marked by isolation and prejudice. About a year after the poisoning trial, Lewis was accused of stealing artists' materials from the college. She was acquitted due to lack of evidence. Only a few months later she was charged with aiding and abetting a burglary. At this point she had had enough, and left. Another report says that she was forbidden from registering for her last term, leaving her unable to graduate.

In 2022, she was awarded a degree posthumously by Oberlin College.

Art career

Boston

After college, Lewis moved to Boston in early 1864, where she began to pursue her career as a sculptor. She repeatedly told a story about encountering in Boston a statue of Benjamin Franklin, not knowing what it was or what to call it, but concluding she could make a "stone man" herself. 

The Keeps wrote a letter of introduction on Lewis' behalf to abolitionist William Lloyd Garrison in Boston, as did Henry Highland Garnet. He introduced her to already established sculptors in the area, as well as writers who publicized Lewis in the abolitionist press. Finding an instructor, however, was not easy for her. Three male sculptors refused to instruct her before she was introduced to the moderately successful sculptor, Edward Augustus Brackett (1818–1908), who specialized in marble portrait busts. His clients were some of the most important abolitionists of the day, including Henry Wadsworth Longfellow, Wm. Lloyd Garrison, Charles Sumner, and John Brown. 

To instruct her, he lent her fragments of sculptures to copy in clay, which he critiqued. Under his tutelage, she crafted her own sculpting tools and sold her first piece, a sculpture of a woman's hand, for $8. Anne Whitney, a fellow sculptor and friend of Lewis', wrote in an 1864 letter to her sister that Lewis's relationship with her instructor did not end amicably, but did not disclose the reason for the split. Lewis opened her studio to the public in her first solo exhibition in 1864.

Lewis was inspired by the lives of abolitionists and Civil War heroes. Her subjects in 1863 and 1864 included some of the most famous abolitionists of her day: John Brown and Colonel Robert Gould Shaw. When she met Union Colonel Shaw, the commander of an African-American Civil War regiment from Massachusetts, she was inspired to create a bust of his likeness, which impressed the Shaw family, who purchased it. Lewis then made plaster-cast reproductions of the bust; she sold one hundred at 15 dollars apiece. This was her most famous work to date and the money she earned from the busts allowed her to eventually move to Rome. Anna Quincy Waterston, a poet, then wrote a poem about both Lewis and Shaw.

From 1864 to 1871, Lewis was written about or interviewed by Lydia Maria Child, Elizabeth Peabody, Anna Quincy Waterston, and Laura Curtis Bullard: all important women in Boston and New York abolitionist circles. Because of these women, articles about Lewis appeared in important abolitionist journals, including Broken Fetter, the Christian Register, and the Independent, as well as many others. Lewis was aware of her reception in Boston. She was not opposed to the coverage she received in the abolitionist press, and she was not known to turn down monetary aid, but she could not tolerate the false praise. She knew that some did not really appreciate her art, but saw her as an opportunity to express and show their support for human rights.

Early works that proved highly popular included medallion portraits of the abolitionists John Brown, described as "her hero", and Wm. Lloyd Garrison. Lewis also drew inspiration from Henry Wadsworth Longfellow and his work, particularly his epic poem The Song of Hiawatha. She made several busts of its leading characters, which he drew from Ojibwe legend.

Rome

The success and popularity of these works in Boston allowed Lewis to bear the cost of a trip to Rome in 1866. On her 1865 passport is written, "M. Edmonia Lewis is a Black girl sent by subscription to Italy having displayed great talents as a sculptor". The established sculptor Hiram Powers gave her space to work in his studio. She entered a circle of expatriate artists and established her own space within the former studio of 18th-century Italian sculptor Antonio Canova, just off the Piazza Barberini. She received professional support from both Charlotte Cushman, a Boston actress and a pivotal figure for expatriate sculptors in Rome, and Maria Weston Chapman, a dedicated worker for the anti-slavery cause.

Lewis spent most of her adult career in Rome, where Italy's less pronounced racism allowed increased opportunity to a black artist. There Lewis enjoyed more social, spiritual, and artistic freedom than she had had in the United States. She was Catholic and Rome allowed her both spiritual and physical closeness to her faith. In America, Lewis would have had to continue relying on abolitionist patronage; but Italy allowed her to make her own in the international art world. She began sculpting in marble, working within the neoclassical manner, but focusing on naturalism within themes and images relating to black and American Indian people. The surroundings of the classical world greatly inspired her and influenced her work, in which she recreated the classical art style—such as presenting people in her sculptures as draped in robes rather than in contemporary clothing.

Lewis was unique in the way she approached sculpting abroad. She insisted on enlarging her clay and wax models in marble herself, rather than hire native Italian sculptors to do it for her – the common practice at the time. Male sculptors were largely skeptical of the talent of female sculptors, and often accused them of not doing their own work. Harriet Hosmer, a fellow sculptor and expatriate, also did this. Lewis also was known to make sculptures before receiving commissions for them, or sent unsolicited works to Boston patrons requesting that they raise funds for materials and shipping.

While in Rome, Lewis continued to express her African-American and Native American heritage. One of her more famous works, "Forever Free", depicted a powerful image of an African-American man and woman emerging from the bonds of slavery. Another sculpture Lewis created was called "The Arrow Maker", which showed a Native American father teaching his daughter how to make an arrow.

Her work sold for large sums of money. In 1873 an article in the New Orleans Picayune stated: "Edmonia Lewis had snared two 50,000-dollar commissions." Her new-found popularity made her studio a tourist destination. Lewis had many major exhibitions during her rise to fame, including one in Chicago, Illinois, in 1870, and in Rome in 1871.

In 1872, Edmonia was summoned to Peterboro, New York, to sculpt wealthy abolitionist Gerrit Smith, a project conceived by his friends. Smith was not pleased and what Lewis completed was a sculpture of the clasped hands of Gerrit and his beloved wife Ann.

The Death of Cleopatra
 
A major coup in her career was participating in the 1876 Centennial Exposition in Philadelphia. For this, she created a monumental 3,015-pound marble sculpture, The Death of Cleopatra, portraying the queen in the throes of death. This piece depicts the moment popularized by Shakespeare in Antony and Cleopatra, in which Cleopatra had allowed herself to be bitten by a poisonous asp following the loss of her crown.  Of the piece, J. S. Ingraham wrote that Cleopatra was "the most remarkable piece of sculpture in the American section" of the Exposition. Much of the viewing public was shocked by Lewis's frank portrayal of death, but the statue drew thousands of viewers nonetheless. Cleopatra was considered a woman of both sensuous beauty and demonic power, and her self-annihilation has been portrayed numerously in art, literature and cinema. In Death of Cleopatra, Edmonia Lewis added an innovative flair by portraying the Egyptian queen in a disheveled, inelegant manner, a departure from the refined, composed Victorian approach of representing death. Considering Lewis's interest in emancipation imagery as seen in her work Forever Free, it is not surprising that Lewis eliminated Cleopatra's usual companion figures of loyal slaves from her work.  Lewis's The Death of Cleopatra may have been a response to the culture of the Centennial Exposition, which celebrated one hundred years of the United States being built around the principles of liberty and freedom, a celebration of unity despite centuries of slavery, the recent Civil War, and the failing attempts and efforts of Reconstruction. In order to avoid any acknowledgement of black empowerment by the Centennial, Lewis's sculpture could not have directly addressed the subject of Emancipation.  Although her white contemporaries were also sculpting Cleopatra and other comparable subject matter (such as Harriet Hosmer's Zenobia), Lewis was more prone to scrutiny on the premise of race and gender due to the fact that she, like Cleopatra, was female:

The associations between Cleopatra and a black Africa were so profound that...any depiction of the ancient Egyptian queen had to contend with the issue of her race and the potential expectation of her blackness. Lewis' white queen gained the aura of historical accuracy through primary research without sacrificing its symbolic links to abolitionism, black Africa, or black diaspora. But what it refused to facilitate was the racial objectification of the artist's body. Lewis could not so readily become the subject of her own representation if her subject was corporeally white.

After being placed in storage, the statue was moved to the 1878 Chicago Interstate Exposition, where it remained unsold. Then the sculpture was acquired by a gambler by the name of "Blind John" Condon, who purchased it from a saloon on Clark Street to mark the grave of a Racehorse named "Cleopatra".  The grave was in front of the grandstand of his Harlem race track in the Chicago suburb of Forest Park, where the sculpture remained for nearly a century until the land was bought by the U.S. Postal Service and the sculpture was moved to a construction storage yard in Cicero, Illinois.  While at the storage yard, The Death of Cleopatra sustained extensive damage at the hands of well-meaning Boy Scouts who painted and caused other damage to the sculpture. Dr. James Orland, a dentist in Forest Park and member of the Forest Park Historical Society, acquired the sculpture and held it in private storage at the Forest Park Mall.

Later, Marilyn Richardson, an assistant professor in the erstwhile The Writing Program at the Massachusetts Institute of Technology (MIT), and later curator and scholar of African-American art, went searching for The Death of Cleopatra for her biography of Lewis. Richardson was directed to the Forest Park Historical Society and Dr. Orland by the Metropolitan Museum of Art, who had earlier been contacted by the historical society regarding the sculpture. Richardson, after confirming the sculpture's location, contacted African-American bibliographer Dorothy Porter Wesley, and the two gained the attention of NMAA's George Gurney. According to Gurney, Curator Emeritus at the Smithsonian American Art Museum, the sculpture was in a race track in Forest Park, Illinois, during World War II. Finally, the sculpture came under the purview of the Forest Park Historical Society, who donated it to Smithsonian American Art Museum in 1994. Chicago-based Andrezej Dajnowski, in conjunction with the Smithsonian, spent $30,000 to restore it to its near-original state. The repairs were extensive, including the nose, sandals, hands, chin, and extensive "sugaring" (disintegration.)

Later career
A testament to Lewis's renown as an artist came in 1877, when former U.S. President Ulysses S. Grant commissioned her to do his portrait. He sat for her as a model and was pleased with her finished piece. She also contributed a bust of Massachusetts abolitionist senator Charles Sumner to the 1895 Atlanta Exposition.

In the late 1880s, neoclassicism declined in popularity, as did the popularity of Lewis's artwork. She continued sculpting in marble, increasingly creating altarpieces and other works for Catholic patrons. A bust of Christ, created in her Rome studio in 1870, was rediscovered in Scotland in 2015. In the art world, she became eclipsed by history, and lost fame. By 1901 she had moved to London. 

The events of her later years are not known.

Death

From 1896 to 1901 Lewis lived in Paris. She then relocated to the Hammersmith area of London, England, before her death on September 17, 1907, in the Hammersmith Borough Infirmary. According to her death certificate, the cause of her death was chronic kidney failure (Bright's disease). She is buried in St. Mary's Catholic Cemetery, in London.

There were earlier theories that Lewis died in Rome in 1907 or, alternatively, that she had died in Marin County, California, and was buried in an unmarked grave in San Francisco.

In 2017, a GoFundMe by East Greenbush, New York, town historian Bobbie Reno was successful, and Edmonia Lewis's grave was restored. The work was done by the E M Lander Co. in London.

Reception 
As a black artist, Edmonia Lewis had to be conscious of her stylistic choices, as her largely white audience often gravely misread her work as self-portraiture. In order to avoid this, her female figures typically possess European features. Lewis had to balance her own personal identity with her artistic, social, and national identity, a tiring activity that affected her art.

In her 2007 work, Charmaine Nelson wrote of Lewis:

It is hard to overstate the visual incongruity of the black-Native female body, let alone that identity in a sculptor, within the Roman colony. As the first black-Native sculptor of either sex to achieve international recognition within a western sculptural tradition, Lewis was a symbolic and social anomaly within a dominantly white bourgeois and aristocratic community.

Personal life
Lewis never married and had no known children. According to her biographer, Dr. Marilyn Richardson, there is no definite information about her romantic involvement with anyone. However, in 1873 her engagement was announced,
and in 1875, her fiance's skin color was revealed to be the same as hers, although his name is not given. There is no further reference to this engagement.

Her half-brother Samuel became a barber in San Francisco, eventually moving to mining camps in Idaho and Montana. In 1868, he settled in the city of Bozeman, Montana, where he set up a barber shop on Main Street. He prospered, eventually investing in commercial real estate, and subsequently built his own home which still stands at 308 South Bozeman Avenue. In 1999 the Samuel Lewis House was placed on the National Register of Historic Places. In 1884, he married Mrs. Melissa Railey Bruce, a widow with six children. The couple had one son, Samuel E. Lewis (1886–1914), who married but died childless. The elder Lewis died after "a short illness" in 1896 and is buried in Sunset Hills Cemetery in Bozeman. The mayor of Bozeman was a pallbearer.

Popular works

Old Arrow-Maker and his Daughter (1866)
This sculpture was inspired by Lewis's Native American heritage. An arrow-maker and his daughter sit on a round base, dressed in traditional Native American clothes. The male figure has recognizable Native American facial features, but not the daughter. As white audiences' misread her work as self-portraiture, she often removed all facial features associated with "colored" races in female portrayal.

Forever Free (1867)

The words "forever free" are taken from President Lincoln's Emancipation Proclamation.

This white marble sculpture represents a man standing, staring up, and raising his left arm into the air. Wrapped around his left wrist is a chain; however, this chain is not restraining him. To his right is a woman kneeling with her hands held in a prayer position. The man's right hand is gently placed on her right shoulder. Forever Free is a celebration of black liberation, salvation, and redemption, and represents the emancipation of African-American slaves. Lewis attempted to break stereotypes of African-American women with this sculpture. For example, she portrayed the woman as completely dressed while the man was partially dressed. This drew attention away from the notion of African-American women being sexual figures. This sculpture also symbolizes the end of the Civil War. While African Americans were legally free, they continued to be restrained, shown by the fact that the couple had chains wrapped around their bodies. The representation of race and gender has been critiqued by modern scholars, particularly the Eurocentric features of the female figure.  This piece is held by Howard University Gallery of Art in Washington, D.C.

Hagar (1875)
Lewis had a tendency to sculpt historically strong women, as demonstrated not just in Hagar but also in Lewis's Cleopatra piece. Lewis also depicted ordinary women in extreme situations, emphasizing their strength. Hagar is inspired by a character from the Old Testament, the handmaid or slave of Abraham's wife Sarah. Being unable to conceive a child, Sarah gave Hagar to Abraham, in order to bear him a son. Hagar gave birth to Abraham's firstborn son Ishmael, and after Sarah gave birth to her own son Isaac, she resented Hagar and made Abraham "cast her into the wilderness". The piece was made of white marble, and Hagar is standing as if about to walk on, with her hands clasped in prayer and staring slightly up but not straight across. Lewis uses Hagar to symbolize the African mother in the United States, and the frequent sexual abuse of African women by white men.

The Death of Cleopatra (1876)
Discussed above.

In popular media 
 Namesake of the Edmonia Lewis Center for Women and Transgender People at Oberlin College.
 Written about in Olio, which is a book of poetry written by Tyehimba Jess that was released in 2016. That book won the 2017 Pulitzer Prize for Poetry.
 Honored with a Google Doodle on February 1, 2017.
 Stone Mirrors: The Sculpture and Silence of Edmonia Lewis, by Jeannine Atkins (2017), is a juvenile biographical novel in verse.
 A belated obituary was published in The New York Times in 2018 as part of their Overlooked series.
 The best-selling novel, La linea del colori: Il Grand Tour di Lafanu Brown, by Somalian Igiaba Scelgo (Florence: Giunti, 2020), in Italian, combines the characters of Edmonia Lewis and Sarah Parker Remond and is dedicated to Rome and to these two figures.
 She features as a "Great Artist" in the video game Civilization VI.
 Lewis is the subject of a stage play entitled "Edmonia" by Barry M. Putt, Jr., presented by Beacon Theatre Productions in Philadelphia, PA in 2021. "Edmonia" stage play.
 Lewis had a U.S. postal stamp unveiled in her honor on January 26, 2022.

List of major works 

 John Brown medallions, 1864–65
 Colonel Robert Gould Shaw (plaster), 1864
 Anne Quincy Waterston, 1866
 A Freed Woman and Her Child, 1866
 The Old Arrow-Maker and His Daughter, 1866
 The Marriage of Hiawatha, 1866–67
 Forever Free, 1867
 Colonel Robert Gould Shaw (marble), 1867–68
 Hagar in the Wilderness, 1868
 Madonna Holding the Christ Child, 1869
 Hiawatha, collection of the Metropolitan Museum of Art, 1868
 Minnehaha, collection of the Metropolitan Museum of Art, 1868
 Indian Combat, Carrara marble, 30" high, collection of the Cleveland Museum of Art, 1868
 Henry Wadsworth Longfellow, 1869–71
 Bust of Abraham Lincoln, 187022, 
 Asleep, 1872
 Awake, 1872
 Poor Cupid, 1873
 Moses, 1873
 Bust of James Peck Thomas, 1874, collection of the Allen Memorial Art Museum, her only known portrait of a freed slave
 Hygieia, 1874
 Hagar, 1875
 The Death of Cleopatra, marble, 1876, collection of Smithsonian American Art Museum
 John Brown, 1876, Rome, plaster bust
 Henry Wadsworth Longfellow, 1876, Rome, plaster bust
 General Ulysses S. Grant, 1877–78
 Veiled Bride of Spring, 1878
 John Brown, 1878–79
 The Adoration of the Magi, 1883
 Charles Sumner, 1895

Gallery

Posthumous exhibitions
 Art of the American Negro Exhibition, American Negro Exposition, Chicago, Illinois, 1940.
 Howard University, Washington, D.C., 1967.
 Vassar College, New York, 1972.
 Michael Rosenfeld Gallery, New York, 2008.
 Edmonia Lewis and Henry Wadsworth Longfellow: Images and Identities at the Fogg Art Museum, Cambridge, Massachusetts, February18 –May 3, 1995.
 Smithsonian American Art Museum, Washington, D.C., June 7, 1996 – April 14, 1997.
 Wildfire Test Pit, Allen Memorial Art Museum, Oberlin College, Oberlin, Ohio, August 30, 2016 – June 12, 2017.
Hearts of Our People: Native Women Artists, (2019), Minneapolis Institute of Art, Minneapolis, Minnesota, United States.
 Edmonia Lewis’ Bust of Christ, Mount Stuart, UK

See also
 List of female sculptors
 Samuel Lewis House (Bozeman, Montana): Brother's house in Montana
 Moses Jacob Ezekiel, another American sculptor in Rome around the same time period, and also included in 1876 Philadelphia exposition.
 Women in the art history field

Notes

References

Bibliography
 
 
 
 
 
 
 
 
 
 
 

 
Richardson, Marilyn (2009). "Edmonia Lewis and Her Italian Circle," in Serpa Salenius, ed., Sculptors, Painters, and Italy: ItalianInfluence on Nineteenth-Century American Art, Padua, Italy: Il Prato Casa Editrice, pp. 99–110. Retrieved February 1, 2019.
Richardson, Marilyn (2011). "Sculptor's Death Unearthed: Edmonia Lewis Died in 1907," ARTFIXdaily, January 9, 2011. Retrieved February 1, 2019.
Richardson, Marilyn (2011). "Three Indians in Battle by Edmonia Lewis," Maine Antique Digest, Jan. 2011, p. 10-A. Retrieved February 1, 2019.
Richardson, Marilyn (1986). "Vita: Edmonia Lewis," Harvard Magazine, March 1986. Retrieved February 1, 2019.
 
 
Rindfleisch, Jan (2017). Roots and Offshoots: Silicon Valley's Arts Community. pp. 61–62. Santa Clara, CA: Ginger Press.

Further reading
 
 
 

 

 
Rindfleisch, Jan (2017), with articles by Maribel Alvarez and Raj Jayadev, edited by Nancy Hom and Ann Sherman. Roots and Offshoots: Silicon Valley's Arts Community. Santa Clara, CA: Ginger Press.

External links

 
 
 
 
 

1844 births
1907 deaths
19th-century American sculptors
19th-century American women artists
20th-century African-American artists
20th-century African-American women
20th-century American women artists
African-American Catholics
African-American sculptors
African-American women artists
Alumni of Bedford College, London
American expatriates in Italy
American expatriates in the United Kingdom
American people of Haitian descent
American people of Ojibwe descent
American women sculptors
Black Native American people
Burials at St Mary's Catholic Cemetery, Kensal Green
Native American sculptors
Native American women artists
New York Central College alumni
Oberlin College alumni
People acquitted of manslaughter
Sculptors from New York (state)
19th-century Native American women
20th-century Native American women
20th-century Native Americans